The Pigott Building is an 18-storey condominium building located at 36 James Street South in downtown Hamilton, Ontario, Canada. This Art Deco/Gothic Revival style building was designed by Hamilton architects Bernard and Fred Prack and is designated under the Ontario Heritage Act.

Built for $1,000,000, The Pigott Building was originally an office building and was Hamilton's first skyscraper. Named after the construction company that built it, the Pigott Construction Company, many of Hamilton's landmarks were built by the company. Some of these include the Canadian Westinghouse offices, the Bank of Montreal Building (1928) on James Street North, McMaster University (1930), Westdale Secondary School (1931), Cathedral of Christ the King (1933), the Burlington Bay James N. Allan Skyway bridge (1958), Hamilton City Hall (1960) and Copps Coliseum (1985) on York & Bay Streets.

Pigott also built some of Canada's largest industrial plants and finest buildings: the Royal Ontario Museum, Toronto; Skylon Tower at Niagara Falls, Crown Life Insurance Company head office, Toronto; Bank of Canada, Ottawa; a plant for General Motors, Oshawa, and buildings for A. V. Roe Company in Malton.

It was at this location that the Canadian Club Movement had its beginning on December 6, 1892.

Images

See also
List of tallest buildings in Hamilton, Ontario

References

External links

Hamilton Halton Construction Hall of Fame: Joseph Pigott
McMaster University Libraries (Archives & Research Collections): Pigott, J.M., Pigott Construction Company
Hamilton Skyscraper page- diagrams
Canadian Club of Hamilton: History

Office buildings completed in 1929
Buildings and structures in Hamilton, Ontario
Art Deco architecture in Canada
Residential condominiums in Canada
Gothic Revival architecture in Canada